Akasya Asıltürkmen (born 14 April 1977) is a Turkish acting coach, film, stage, television and voice actress. She studied Theatre at Mimar Sinan Fine Arts University in Istanbul. Asıltürkmen is of mixed Circassian, Georgian, Laz and Turkish origin.

Filmography

Film

Television

Stage

References

External links
 
 

1977 births
Mimar Sinan Fine Arts University alumni
Turkish television actresses
Turkish film actresses
Turkish people of Circassian descent
Turkish people of Georgian descent
Turkish people of Laz descent
Turkish people of Tatar descent
Living people
Actresses from Istanbul